The 2019–20 Swiss Cup was the 95th season of Switzerland's annual football cup competition. The competition began on 16 August 2019 with the first games of Round 1 was originally scheduled to end on 24 May 2020 but the final was rescheduled to 30 August 2020, due to the COVID-19 pandemic.

Basel were the title holders. They were beaten in the final by Young Boys of Bern, securing their first Swiss Cup title since 1987.

Participating clubs
All teams from 2018–19 Super League and 2018–19 Challenge League as well as the top 4 teams from 2018–19 Promotion League automatically entered this year's competition. The remaining 41 teams had to qualify through separate qualifying rounds within their leagues. Reserve teams and A-teams from Liechtenstein were not allowed in the competition, the latter only entered the 2019–20 Liechtenstein Cup.

Teams in bold are still active in the competition.

TH Title holders.

Round 1
Teams from Super League and Challenge League were seeded in this round. In a match, the home advantage was granted to the team from the lower league, if applicable. Teams in bold continue to the next round of the competition.

|-
| colspan="3" style="background:#9cc;"|16 August 2019

|-
| colspan="3" style="background:#9cc;"|17 August 2019

|-
| colspan="3" style="background:#9cc;"|18 August 2019

|}

Round 2
The winners of Round 1 played in this round. Teams from Super League were seeded, the home advantage was granted to the team from the lower league, if applicable.

|-
|colspan="3" style="background-color:#99CCCC"|13 September 2019

|-
|colspan="3" style="background-color:#99CCCC"|14 September 2019

|-
|colspan="3" style="background-color:#99CCCC"|15 September 2019

|}

Round 3

|-
|colspan="3" style="background-color:#99CCCC"|29 October 2019

|-
|colspan="3" style="background-color:#99CCCC"|30 October 2019

|-
|colspan="3" style="background-color:#99CCCC"|31 October 2019

|}

Quarter-finals

|-
|colspan="3" style="background-color:#99CCCC"|14 June 2020

|-
|colspan="3" style="background-color:#99CCCC"|5 August 2020

|-
|colspan="3" style="background-color:#99CCCC"|6 August 2020

|}

Semi-finals

|-
|colspan="3" style="background-color:#99CCCC"|9 August 2020

|-
|colspan="3" style="background-color:#99CCCC"|25 August 2020

|}

Final

Top scorers

References

Sources 
 Switzerland 2019–20 by Karel Stokkermans at Rec.Sport.Soccer Statistics Foundation

External links
 Official site 
 Official site 
 Official site 

Swiss Cup seasons
Swiss Cup
Cup
Swiss Cup